The 2019–20 Celtic Cup was the second edition of the Celtic Cup rugby union competition, which features development regional and provincial teams from Ireland and Wales. It ran from August 2019 until October 2019, with a change to a single table format from the original conference system. 

Leinster A, winners of the inaugural edition, defended their title by beating first time finalists Ulster A in an all-Ireland final 31–10.

Formation and purpose

The Irish Rugby Football Union and the Welsh Rugby Union created a new development competition, the Celtic Cup, for the emerging professional players from the four Irish provinces and four Welsh regions, announcing the tournament in August 2018.

The tournament, which features development squads from Pro14 teams Connacht, Leinster, Munster, Ulster, Cardiff Blues, Dragons, Ospreys and Scarlets, aims to provide a learning environment for development players, coaches and referees by recreating the week-to-week challenges presented by senior professional rugby.

2019–20 season

In a change from the 2018–19 tournament, the 2019–20 edition of the competition featured all eight teams in a single round-robin league format, rather than two conferences. Each team playing seven matches and the top two teams advanced to the final.

Table

Pool Stage

Round 1

Round 2

Round 3

Round 4

Round 5

Round 6

Round 7

Final

References

Celtic Cup (2018 rugby union tournament)
2019–20 in European rugby union
Celtic Cup
Celtic Cup